Carles Coto Pagès (born 11 February 1988) is a Spanish footballer who plays for FC Santa Coloma as a right winger.

Club career
Born in Figueres, Girona, Catalonia, Coto arrived in FC Barcelona's youth system in 2001 at the age of 13, from local UE Figueres. While at Barcelona, he featured in Nike's 2005 “Recuerda mi nombre” (“Remember my name”) advertisement alongside fellow La Masia prospect Lionel Messi. He then moved to R.E. Mouscron in Belgium, being released after one season.

Coto returned to his country in the summer of 2008, playing with Sevilla Atlético in Segunda División and Benidorm CF in Segunda División B, suffering relegation with the former. In early July 2010, even though he still had one year of contract with the Valencian Community club, he changed teams and countries again, signing for Anorthosis Famagusta FC in Cyprus, managed by his former Barcelona youth coach Guillermo Ángel Hoyos.

On 28 June 2011, Coto joined FC Dinamo Tbilisi in Georgia, sharing teams with several compatriots. In February 2014 he signed for Uzbek League side Bunyodkor PFK, but left in July, quickly agreeing to a one-year deal with San Marino Calcio in the Lega Pro.

On 29 August 2017, the 29-year-old Coto returned to Spain with CF Rayo Majadahonda after brief stints with Cypriot clubs Ethnikos Achna FC, Doxa Katokopias FC and Ermis Aradippou FC.

Club statistics

Honours

Club
Dinamo Tbilisi
Georgian Premier League: 2012–13

Bunyodkor
Uzbekistan Super Cup: 2014

International
Spain U19
UEFA European Under-19 Championship: 2007

References

External links

1988 births
Living people
People from Figueres
Sportspeople from the Province of Girona
Spanish footballers
Footballers from Catalonia
Association football wingers
Spain youth international footballers
Royal Excel Mouscron players
Sevilla Atlético players
Benidorm CF footballers
Anorthosis Famagusta F.C. players
FC Dinamo Tbilisi players
FC Dinamo Minsk players
FC Bunyodkor players
A.S.D. Victor San Marino players
Ethnikos Achna FC players
Doxa Katokopias FC players
Ermis Aradippou FC players
CF Rayo Majadahonda players
Volos N.F.C. players
UE Figueres footballers
FC Santa Coloma players
Segunda División players
Segunda División B players
Belgian Pro League players
Cypriot First Division players
Erovnuli Liga players
Serie C players
Football League (Greece) players
Spanish expatriate footballers
Expatriate footballers in Belgium
Expatriate footballers in Cyprus
Expatriate footballers in Georgia (country)
Expatriate footballers in Belarus
Expatriate footballers in Uzbekistan
Expatriate footballers in Italy
Expatriate footballers in Greece
Expatriate footballers in Andorra
Spanish expatriate sportspeople in Belgium
Spanish expatriate sportspeople in Cyprus
Spanish expatriate sportspeople in Georgia (country)
Spanish expatriate sportspeople in Belarus
Spanish expatriate sportspeople in Italy
Spanish expatriate sportspeople in Greece